Between January 31 to February 1, heavy rains in Haiti caused floods. On February 1, five people had been killed by the floods with one more person missing.

On March 7, a storm hit the Puerto Plata province of the Dominican Republic and the Nord Department of Haiti, leaving 2 Haitians dead.

On September 1, a flood destroyed upwards of 350 homes and killed 3 in the Ouest Department.

See also 
Weather of 2022

References

2022 floods in North America
2022 in Haiti
Floods in Haiti
January 2022 events in North America
February 2022 events in North America